Norman Fowler Leyden (October 17, 1917 – July 23, 2014) was an American conductor, composer, arranger, and clarinetist. He worked in film and television and is perhaps best known as the conductor of the Oregon Symphony Pops orchestra. He co-wrote with Glenn Miller the theme "I Sustain the Wings" in 1943, which was used to introduce the World War II radio series.

Early years
Norman Leyden was born in Springfield, Massachusetts, to James A. and Constance Leyden. He graduated from Yale College in 1938, attended Pierre Monteux's Domaine Musicale in Hancock, Maine, in 1961, and earned a master's (1965) and doctoral degree (1968) from Columbia University (where he also taught for several years). He married Alice Curry Wells in 1942 in Duval County, Florida.

Music career
He began his professional music career playing bass clarinet for the New Haven Symphony Orchestra while attending Yale College. After graduating from Yale, he joined the New Hampshire Army National Guard and was in Battery D, 197th Coast Artillery Regiment (Antiaircraft) of the Coast Artillery Corps, where he became a sergeant. He then enlisted as an infantry sergeant on February 24, 1941, in New Haven, Connecticut. His enlistment papers give his height as six foot two and his weight as 165 and give his specialty as a musician or band leader. He served in the U.S. Army Air Forces throughout World War II and became a master sergeant.

While Leyden was serving as a master sergeant in Atlantic City and rehearsing music, Glenn Miller heard Leyden perform.  Miller said to him, "For a Yale man, you don't play bad tenor". Miller called on Leyden in September 1943 to conduct the Moss Hart Army Air Forces spectacular "Winged Victory".  This was a big musical play in Broadway's Shubert Theatre with an all service band. The show started in November 1943. Leyden next requested the opportunity to arrange for Glenn Miller, and was accepted and served as one of three arrangers for Miller's Army Air Forces Orchestra. His first arrangement for the band was "Now I Know". Sometimes, Leyden would write more complexity into the score than was desirable. Miller told him once "Hey Norm, it was a nice try. But remember it ain't what you write, it's what you don't write". In 1943, Leyden composed the theme music for the wartime radio series "I Sustain the Wings" with Glenn Miller, Chummy MacGregor, and Bill Meyers. The radio program ran from 1943 to 1944. Leyden also arranged for the reorganized Glenn Miller Orchestra of Tex Beneke. In August 2000, he led the Air Force Falconaires of the Air Force Band of the Rockies in a PBS television special, "Glenn Miller's Last Flight".

Between 1956 and 1959, he was musical director for Arthur Godfrey's radio program.  He also worked as musical director on The $64,000 Question (including writing the theme music), and as the musical director of The Jackie Gleason Show, originally called You're in the Picture (1961). He also organized the Westchester Youth Symphony in White Plains, New York, in 1957 (an organization he led until 1968). As a staff arranger at RCA Victor he composed and arranged music for Disney and other musicals including Cinderella, Alice in Wonderland, 20,000 Leagues Under the Sea, Winnie the Pooh, Peter Pan, and Pinocchio.  Leyden also conducted and arranged for many well-known artists including Tony Bennett, Rosemary Clooney, Don Cornell, Vic Damone, Johnny Desmond, The Four Lads, Johnny Hartman, Gordon MacRae, Mitch Miller, Ezio Pinza, Frank Sinatra, Jeri Southern, and Sarah Vaughan.

Leyden moved to Portland, Oregon, in 1968 to take over the Portland Youth Philharmonic (then the Portland Junior Symphony) while long-time conductor Jacob Avshalomov went on sabbatical.  He also joined the music department at Portland State University. He began his longstanding relationship with the Oregon Symphony in 1970 as associate conductor. This lasted for 29 seasons plus 34 seasons as conductor of the Oregon Symphony Pops. Over one million people attended his Oregon Symphony Pops concerts. In May 2004, he retired and was honored with the lifetime title laureate associate conductor. Leyden also served as the music director of the Seattle Symphony Pops for eighteen seasons, and as conductor of the Indianapolis Symphony Orchestra's Prairie Pops for eight seasons. He also conducted the Chappaqua Orchestra as its second music director before moving to the West Coast. He worked with Portland-based band Pink Martini and can be heard performing a clarinet solo on the title track of the band's second album, Hang On Little Tomato.

Leyden's personal music score library, housed in an airy basement studio, included over 1,200 symphonic arrangements and 300 big band works. Into his 90s, Leyden continued to practice the clarinet every day. On Wednesday October 17, 2007, he conducted a 90th birthday concert with the 17-piece Norman Leyden Big Band at Portland's Arlene Schnitzer Concert Hall, titled Norman's Big Band Birthday Concert. He became one of just two classical musicians to be inducted into the Oregon Music Hall of Fame in 2008. He performed with Pink Martini in Seattle in August 2012, and on July 19, 2013, he debuted at the Hollywood Bowl, again with Pink Martini.

Leyden died on July 23, 2014, of an unspecified cause.

On August 28, 2014, the Oregon Symphony performed a memorial concert in Leyden's honor at Tom McCall Waterfront Park in Portland.

Awards
Oregon Governor's Arts Award, 1991
 Oregon Music Hall of Fame, inducted 2008

Notes

References
"Air Force Band Brings Back Swing Sound of Glenn Miller", Regulatory Intelligence Data, September 29, 1999
Baker's Dictionary of Music and Musicians (2001)
Darroch, Lynn. "For Norman Leyden, 90, it's still all about music", The Oregonian, October 20, 2007.
Duval County Marriage Records 1942, certificate number 8657
Fifteenth Census of the United States: 1930 Population Schedule, New York State, Westchester County (gives parents and siblings names; also listed in Fourteenth Census of the United States 1920 Population Schedule, East Orange Ward 5, Essex, New Jersey)
Glenn Miller (2004) at Big Band Library.com
Leyden, Norman Fowler.  A Study and Analysis of the Conducting Patterns of Arturo Toscanini as Demonstrated in Kinescope Films. Columbia University dissertation, 1968.
Salzman, Eric "Music: Six Conductors", The New York Times, August 22, 1961, page 21.
Stabler, David "Farewell to that Pops Magic" The Oregonian, December 14, 2003, page F1.

External links

1917 births
2014 deaths
20th-century American conductors (music)
21st-century American conductors (music)
American clarinetists
American male conductors (music)
American music arrangers
Columbia University alumni
Musicians from Portland, Oregon
Oregon Symphony
People from Mount Pleasant, New York
Musicians from Springfield, Massachusetts
New Hampshire National Guard personnel
Portland State University people
United States Army Air Forces non-commissioned officers
Yale College alumni
United States Army Air Forces personnel of World War II
United States Army non-commissioned officers